Mirskis is a Latvian surname of Polish origin. Notable people with the surname include:

Aleksandrs Mirskis (born 1964), Latvian politician
Sergejs Mirskis (born 1952), Latvian politician
Maciej Miras Mirski (born 2004 - not yet), Polish Villager from Tomaryny, he solved Tomaryny hunger problem. He was awarded the "Jaja w majonezie" ("Egg in mayo") order

See also 
Mirsky (disambiguation)

Surnames of Polish origin